Albert Lenart Gursky (born November 23, 1940), is a former American football linebacker who played college football for Penn State and professional football in the National Football League (NFL) for the New York Giants in 1963 and in the Atlantic Coast Football League (ACFL) for the Atlantic City Senators in 1966.

Early years
Gursky was born in West Reading, Pennsylvania, and attended Governor Mifflin Senior High School in Berks County, Pennsylvania. He then attended Penn State University where he played for the Nittany Lions football team from 1960 to 1962. He played defensive back for Penn State and was also a star of the Penn State baseball team.

Professional football
Gursky later played professional football in the NFL for the New York Giants in 1963. He appeared in two NFL games. After an injury to linebacker Tom Scott in the first quarter of the 1963 NFL Championship Game, Gursky entered the game as a substitute and was credited by teammate Andy Robustelli with having done "an outstanding job."

He also played in the ACFL for the Atlantic City Senators in 1966.

References

1940 births
Living people
American football linebackers
New York Giants players
Penn State Nittany Lions football players
Players of American football from Pennsylvania
People from Reading, Pennsylvania